Modi is a Unicode block containing the Modi alphabet characters for writing the Marathi language.

History
The following Unicode-related documents record the purpose and process of defining specific characters in the Modi block:

References 

Unicode blocks